Katrina Best is a British-born short story writer who lives in the United Kingdom.

Biography
Katrina Best is a British-born author who has lived in Canada and the United Kingdom. She is a dual citizen of both countries.

Best published her short story collection Bird Eat Bird in 2010. The work won the Commonwealth Writers' Prize.

After many years in Canada (Vancouver and Montreal), Best currently lives in the UK. She is married to Alan Best. The couple have two children together.

Works

References

External links
Author's website

Living people
British women short story writers
21st-century British short story writers
21st-century British women writers
Year of birth missing (living people)